Spencer Brown (born February 28, 1998) is an American football offensive tackle for the Buffalo Bills of the National Football League (NFL). He played college football at Northern Iowa.

Early life and high school
Brown grew up in Lenox, Iowa and attended Lenox High School, where he played baseball, basketball, golf and ran track in addition to being a member of the school's eight-man football team as a defensive end and tight end. He was named first team All-State as a senior after recording 24 receptions for 388 yards and seven touchdowns on offense and 67 tackles, a state-leading 17 sacks and four fumble recoveries on defense.

College career
Brown started the first five games of his redshirt freshman season before suffering a season-ending knee injury. As a redshirt junior, Brown started all of the Panthers' games and was named second team All-Missouri Valley Football Conference. Brown was named a preseason first team FCS All-American by Phil Steele before announcing that he would forgo his redshirt senior season, which was to be played in the spring due to COVID-19, and prepare for the 2021 NFL Draft.

Professional career

Brown was drafted by the Buffalo Bills with the 93rd pick of the 2021 NFL Draft on April 30, 2021. On July 20, Brown signed his four-year rookie contract with Buffalo. On October 3, 2021, Brown was promoted in the lineup to right tackle for his first career start.

References

External links 

Northern Iowa Panthers bio

1998 births
Living people
American football offensive tackles
Buffalo Bills players
Northern Iowa Panthers football players
People from Lenox, Iowa
Players of American football from Iowa